Below is list of Catholic schools in the state of New South Wales. It is correct as of 26 September 2009.

Systemic primary schools

Systemic secondary schools

Systemic combined primary and secondary schools

Non-systemic schools

Special schools

See also 

 List of non-government schools in New South Wales
 Catholic Education in the Diocese of Parramatta
 Catholic education in Australia
 The Seminary of the Good Shepherd

External links 
 Catholic Education Commission NSW website
 Catholic Education Office Sydney

Catholic

Aust
Roman Catholic Archdiocese of Sydney
Roman Catholic Diocese of Parramatta
Roman Catholic Diocese of Broken Bay
Roman Catholic Diocese of Wollongong
Roman Catholic Diocese of Maitland-Newcastle
Roman Catholic Diocese of Armidale
Roman Catholic Diocese of Bathurst in Australia
Roman Catholic Archdiocese of Canberra and Goulburn
Roman Catholic Diocese of Lismore
Roman Catholic Diocese of Wagga Wagga